Doolwala Kandiyagedera Roshan Chanaka Jayatissa (born 5 June 1989) is a Sri Lankan cricketer. He is a right-handed batsman and right-arm off-break bowler who plays for Sri Lanka Army Sports Club. He was born in Kandy.

Jayatissa made his first-class debut for the side during the 2009-10 Premier Championship, against Chilaw Marians. From the lower order, he scored 4 not out in a drawn match.

External links
Roshan Jayatissa at CricketArchive 

1989 births
Living people
Sri Lankan cricketers
Sri Lanka Army Sports Club cricketers
Cricketers from Kandy